Sekolah Menengah Teknik Alor Setar, or Alor Setar Technical School (ASTECH), is located in Bandar Simpang Kuala, Alor Setar, Kedah and may be the oldest technical school in Malaysia. ASTECH is better known by local people as "Sekolah Teknik Lebuhraya", often confused with Sekolah Menengah Teknik Jalan Stadium (now known as Kolej Vokasional Alor Setar). In front of the school is the famous Wan Mat Saman Aqueduct.

History 
The establishment of ASTECH can be traced to 1972. It was located in KM 2, Lebuhraya Sultan Abdul Halim, Alor Setar near Simpang Kuala. The original site of this school was a paddy field. This school was created when the government started technical education in the state of Kedah. Before it was moved to its own building, students of ASTECH were located in nearby Keat Hwa Secondary School.

Finally in 1972, this school was moved to its own building where it has remained. Other institutions located near to this school are Keat Hwa Secondary School, Maktab Mahmud and SRA Darul Aman.
ASTECH also was chosen by the Technical Education Department as a controlled technical school (Gred A). In 2009, ASTECH was declared as Sekolah Kluster Kecemerlangan or Cluster School of Excellence by the Ministry of Education Malaysia due to advancement in both academic and extra-curricular field of Agricultural Science and Robotic.

Starting in 2011, student uniforms changed from normal to special orange uniforms that is also worn by the students of Technical and Vocational Schools throughout Malaysia.

Principals

Courses 
There are five main courses:

Subjects

Houses 
ASTECH has four houses, each named after Physics's Prefixes. There are:

Achievements and rankings

Notable alumni 
1. Kapten Izham Ismail, CEO Malaysia Airlines Bhd 

2. Yusrizal Yusof, Book Writer

3. Maszlan Ismail, Former Director, Malaysian Space Agency

External links

References 

Technical schools in Malaysia
Secondary schools in Malaysia
1972 establishments in Malaysia
Educational institutions established in 1972